Paguropsis is a genus of hermit crabs in the family Diogenidae.

Species
Paguropsis confusa Lemaitre, Rahayu & Komai, 2018
Paguropsis gigas Lemaitre, Rahayu & Komai, 2018
Paguropsis lacinia Lemaitre, Rahayu & Komai, 2018
Paguropsis typica Henderson, 1888

References

Diogenidae
Decapod genera